Magda Spiegel (1887–1944) was a German contralto who was a member of the Frankfurt Opera ensemble and was murdered in the Auschwitz concentration camp. The baritone Richard Breitenfeld, also of the Frankfurt Opera, shared the same fate.

Peter Hugh Reed wrote in American Record Guide, 1949:
I have also learned with the deepest regret about the similar death of the contralto Magda Spiegel, from Frankfurt. She made some excellent acoustic records in the early 1920s for Odeon, Vox and Homochard – I remember her as a thrilling Adriano in Wagner's Rienzi when the Frankfurt opera company visited Holland in 1934.

References

External links
 Magda Spiegel on operanostalgia.be

German opera singers
Operatic contraltos
German operatic contraltos
1887 births
1944 deaths
German civilians killed in World War II
Musicians from Prague
German people who died in Auschwitz concentration camp
Jewish opera singers
20th-century German musicians
20th-century German women singers
German Jews who died in the Holocaust